The Maoergai Dam is a rock-filled embankment dam on the Heishui River in Mao County of Sichuan Province, China. The primary purpose of the dam is hydroelectric power production and it supports a 420 MW power station. Preliminary construction (roads, bridges and foundation) for the dam began in 2006 while construction on the dam and power station commenced in 2008. The generators were commissioned in 2011. The dam sits just below the headwaters of the Heishui and water discharged through its power station regulates the flow of water for smaller power stations downstream.

See also 

 List of dams and reservoirs in China
 List of tallest dams in China

References

Dams in China
Rock-filled dams
Dams completed in 2011
Energy infrastructure completed in 2011
Hydroelectric power stations in Sichuan
Ngawa Tibetan and Qiang Autonomous Prefecture